Concern Radio-Electronic Technologies (КРЭТ (KRET)) is a holding company within the Russian state-owned Rostec group that develops and manufactures military specialized radio-electronic, state identification, aviation and radio-electronic equipment, multi-purpose measuring devices, detachable electrical connectors and a variety of civil products.

The Corporate Group has developed one of the two existing state radiolocation identification systems.

Structure
Companies of the holding:

 Research and Production Company RITM
 JSC Automatics
 Bryansk Electromechanical Plant
 Vladykinsky Mechanical Plant
 All-Russian Scientific Research Institute Gradient
 State Ryazan Instrument Plant
 Zhigulevsky Radio Plant
 Engineering support of tests Takeoff
 Kazan Instrument-Making Design Bureau
 Kaluga Plant of Radio Engineering Equipment
 Kaluga Research Radio Engineering Institute
 Design Bureau of the plant Russia
 Design Bureau for Radio Monitoring, Navigation and Communication
 Concern Avionika
 Aerospace Equipment Corporation
 Phazotron
 Kursk Plant Mayak
 MKB Compass
 Moscow Institute of Electromechanics and Automation
 Moscow Radio Plant TEMP
 Scientific Research Institute Ekran
 Research Institute of Aviation Equipment
 Research Institute for the Development of Connectors and Specialty Electronics Products
 Scientific-Production Association Kvant
 Scientific Production Association Radioelectronics Shimko
 Scientific-Production Enterprise Izmeritel
 Scientific-Production Enterprise ElTom
 Nizhny Novgorod Research and Production Association named after MV Frunze
 Experimental Design Bureau Electroautomatics named after PA Efimov
 Radium
 Radiopribor
 Ramensky Instrument Making Plant
 Rostov Plant Pribor
 Special Design Bureau of Radio Measuring Equipment
 Taganrog Scientific Research Institute of Communications
 Ulyanovsk Instrument Making Design Bureau
 Ural Instrument Making Plant
 Ufimskoe Instrument-Making Production Association
 FNPTS NNIPI Quartz
 Fazotron-VMZ
 Almetyevsky Plant Radiopribor
 Aeropribor-Voskhod
 Kazan Scientific and Research Technological Institute of Computer Engineering
 Design Bureau of Industrial Automation
 OJSC Microtechnology
 Research Institute of Special Information and Measuring Systems 
 Scientific - Production center SAPSAN
 Scientific and technical center of the system and means of state recognition
 JSC Lever
 Bryansk special design bureau
 Stavropol Radio Plant Signal 
 Tambov Plant Elektropribor
 Techpribor

US sanctions
On July 16, 2014, the Obama administration imposed sanctions through the US Department of Treasury's Office of Foreign Assets Control (OFAC) by adding Concern Radio-Electronic Technologies and other entities to the Specially Designated Nationals List (SDN) in retaliation for the ongoing Russo-Ukrainian War, annexation of the Crimean Peninsula by the Kremlin, and the Russian interference in Ukraine.  Despite that, in 2020 KRET participated in a Russian medical aid delivery during the coronavirus pandemic in New York. Delivering its medical equipment like very need ventilators to the US, with reports claiming that the Russian aid was partly paid by the US and the RDIF. Officials from the US administration replied that sanctions aren't applied for medical supply.

Communications Equipment for Russian Forces 
United Instrument Manufacturing Corporation of KRET/Rostec is producing fifth-generation Rostec R-168-5UN-2 Military-Transceiver. The VHF band radio with GPS data transmit ability and a digital crypto system and an output power of 8 Watt.

References

External links
 Official website

 
Technology companies of Russia
Defence companies of Russia
Russian entities subject to the U.S. Department of the Treasury sanctions